The Alaska Native Language Center, established in 1972 in Fairbanks, Alaska, is a research center focusing on the research and documentation of the Native languages of Alaska. It publishes grammars, dictionaries, folklore collections and research materials, as well as hosting an extensive archive of written materials relating to Eskimo, North Athabaskan and related languages. The Center provides training, materials and consultation for educators, researchers and others working with Alaska Native languages. The closely affiliated Alaska Native Language Program offers degrees in Central Yup'ik and Inupiaq at the University of Alaska Fairbanks, and works toward the documentation and preservation of these languages.

Language map
In 1974, Michael Krauss published a language map of Alaska, which he later updated in 1982.  It has remained the standard since then.  In the summer of 2011, the Alaska Native Language Center made an update to Krauss's map.  One of the biggest reasons for this update was that some of the names of these languages had changed over the years.  While there was not a dramatic change in the updated map, the new edition is entirely digital.

Alaska Native languages

Information in this table was retrieved from the Alaska Native Languages Center.

See also

 Alaska Native Language Archive
 Alaska Native languages
 Eskimo–Aleut languages
 Athabaskan languages
 Michael Krauss, ANLC founder
 Dené–Yeniseian languages

References

External links
 Alaska Native Language Center website

1972 establishments in Alaska
Alaska Native culture in Fairbanks
Alaska Native organizations
Education in Fairbanks North Star Borough, Alaska
Indigenous languages of Alaska
Language education organizations
Linguistic research institutes
Research institutes established in 1972
University of Alaska Fairbanks
Linguists of Na-Dene languages
Linguists of Eskaleut languages